Calystegia malacophylla is a species of morning glory known by the common name Sierra false bindweed
. It is endemic to California, where it grows in several of the mountain ranges, including the Central Coast Ranges and the Sierra Nevada.

Description
This is a rhizomatous perennial herb with a woolly stem growing to lengths of 10 centimeters to nearly a meter. It generally does not climb as do many other morning glories. The leaves are vaguely kidney-shaped to triangular and pointed, and reach a few centimeters in length. The foliage is covered in a short coat of woolly white hairs, giving the plant a light greenish gray color. The inflorescence holds a solitary white flower which is sometimes tinted with pink or yellow. The flower is 2 to 4 centimeters wide when open.

References

External links
Jepson Manual Treatment — Calystegia malacophylla
Calystegia malacophylla — Photo gallery

malacophylla
Endemic flora of California
Flora of the Sierra Nevada (United States)
Natural history of the California Coast Ranges
Flora without expected TNC conservation status